Esser is a surname. Notable people with the surname include:

Esser (musician), English musician born Ben Esser
Bernard Esser (1840-1901), American farmer
Clarence Esser (1921–2009), American football player
Dave Esser (born 1957), English footballer
Dick Esser (1918–1979), Dutch field hockey player
Dragutin Esser, French racing driver
Franz Esser (1900–1982), German footballer
George Esser (died 2006), American civil rights activist
Hans Esser, German fencer
Heinrich Esser (1818–1872), German classical violinist, composer and conductor
Hermann Esser (1900–1981), German Nazi leader
Hermin Esser (1928–2008), German tenor
Irene Esser (born 1991), Venezuelan beauty pageant winner
Jan F. Esser (1877–1946), Dutch plastic surgeon
Janice Ferri Esser, American television writer
Leo Esser (born 1907), German diver
Luke Esser, American politician
Mark Esser (born 1956), American baseball player
Markus Esser (born 1980), German hammer thrower
Michael Esser (born 1987), German footballer
Patrick J. Esser, American businessman
Paul Esser (1913–1988), German actor and voice actor
Piet Esser (1914–2004), Dutch sculptor
Robin Esser (1935-2017), English newspaper executive and editor
Roswitha Esser (born 1941), West German sprint canoeist
Walter Esser (born 1945), German modern pentathlete

See also
Esser Hill, mountain in Victoria Land, Antarctica
Esser Bluff, cliff on Ross Island, Antarctica
Elementary and Secondary School Emergency Relief Fund, also known as ESSER, a U.S. federal government relief program that provided $190 billion dollars to public K-12 schools in response to the COVID-19 pandemic.

German-language surnames